The Battle of the Champions is the traditional name given to the Battle of the 300 Champions, which pitted Argos against Sparta in 546 BC. It may also refer to:

Battle of Champions, a trial by combat fought in 1478 or 1464 between two Scottish clans
The Battle of the Champions (boxing), a 1982 boxing match